The women's 200m T52 event at the 2008 Summer Paralympics took place at the Beijing National Stadium on 11 September. There were no heats in this event.

Final

Competed at 11:12.

PR = Paralympic Record.

References
 
 

W
2008 in women's athletics